The IsoRivolta GTZ is a two-door sports car produced by Italian automobile manufacturer Iso Rivolta in collaboration with design studio Zagato. First shown as a concept named the "IsoRivolta Zagato Vision Gran Turismo" in the popular racing game Gran Turismo Sport, an official unveiling was made at the 2021 Concours of Elegance at Hampton Court Palace. The GTZ is inspired by the Iso A3/C, a 1964 Le Mans class winner which like the GTZ also has a Chevrolet power plant. Production is strictly limited to 19 units, most of which have already been sold.

References 

Iso vehicles
2020s cars
Cars introduced in 2021
Rear-wheel-drive vehicles
Sports cars
Coupés